"Evicted" is the final episode of the HBO comedy series Flight of the Conchords.  This episode first aired in the United States on March 22, 2009.

Plot

After playing an impromptu instrumental number using household appliances and outdoor noise, Bret and Jemaine are paid a visit by their landlord, who demands he be paid for the last two years of rent in American dollars (the duo have been paying in New Zealand dollars).  Lacking the funds, Bret and Jemaine visit Murray for solutions, who is unable to offer them anything promising, except a musical he's been writing since becoming the band's manager.  Broke and evicted, and after being rejected by Murray and Dave, they find themselves with no choice but to move in with Mel and Doug.

At Mel's home, Bret falls into a dream and sings a Russian sailing-themed song, in which he is slowly cannibalized by Mel and Doug, under the disguise of Petrov and Yelyena.  Meanwhile, Murray starts rehearsals for the hopeful off-Broadway musical detailing the journeys and misadventures of Bret and Jemaine, who play the lead parts themselves.  However, it turns out Murray has confused Bret's life with that of Luke Skywalker.

Life at home with Doug and Mel is hard, with frequent arguments arising between the two.  Drama comes to a head when, after offering to play the harp for Bret and Jemaine, Mel tells Doug that harp-playing is very feminine. Doug and Mel decide to separate and, like children from a broken home, Bret and Jemaine are forced to live with separate "parents": Jemaine with Doug, and Bret with Mel.

After their musical's opening night, the embassy members Murray invited become suspicious of the musical's frequent theme of illegal immigration.  Bret and Jemaine are questioned and subsequently deported to New Zealand. Mel and Doug passionately reunite after Mel sees Doug gracefully playing the harp on stage.  The final scene of the episode shows Bret and Jemaine returning to their jobs as shepherds at a farm somewhere near Mount Ruapehu, with Murray working the tractor.

Songs

Everyday Sounds Musical Montage
At the start of the episode, Bret wakes up to the sound of his alarm clock ringing. He and Jemaine then use objects around the apartment to create music. Later that episode, they do the same thing with objects in New Zealand. The musical style is similar to Stomp.

The song they create sounds a lot like the break in "Bra" by the band Cymande, starting at 2:50 minutes.

Petrov, Yelyena, & Me
This song features Bret with Mel and Doug playing Yelyena and Petrov respectively. In the song, all three are stranded on a boat and are suffering from starvation, until Petrov and Yelyena secretly plan to eat Bret gradually overnight, starting with his leg, then his arm. Bret sees them eating bones and questions them about where his legs and arms have gone, and Petrov and Yelyena try to cover up their actions by saying that they're eating the fish. Eventually, Bret grows tired of being eaten and decides to ingest arsenic to poison his meat, despite being sick from doing so. In the end, Petrov and Yelyena die and Bret is left alive with just his head.

This version is noticeably faster and has fewer verses than the original recording on their live album Folk the World Tour, and Jemaine only played Petrov.

Flight of the Conchords: The Broadway Musical
When the Conchords are evicted from their apartment, Murray decides it is time to unleash his musical idea that follows the life of the Conchords. They eventually get a stage and perform a musical, singing songs about their life. The musical itself is like a montage, going through random scenes (the duo coming to America, Jemaine selling himself for sex, etc.). The art imitating life imitating art imitating life theme references the video for Björk's "Bachelorette".

References

2009 American television episodes
Flight of the Conchords episodes
American television series finales
Television episodes directed by Taika Waititi
Television episodes written by Jemaine Clement